Woman with a Hat (French: La femme au chapeau) is a painting by Henri Matisse. An oil on canvas, it depicts Matisse's wife, Amelie. It was painted in 1905 and exhibited at the Salon d'Automne during the fall of the same year, along with works by André Derain, Maurice de Vlaminck and several other artists known as "Fauves".

Critic Louis Vauxcelles, in comparing the paintings of Matisse and his associates with a Renaissance-type sculpture that shared the room with them, used with the phrase "Donatello chez les fauves..." (Donatello among the wild beasts). His comment was printed on 17 October 1905  in Gil Blas, a daily newspaper, and passed into popular usage. Woman with a Hat was at the center of the controversy that led to the term Fauvism. It was also a painting that marked a stylistic shift in the work of Matisse from the Divisionist brushstrokes of his earlier work to a more expressive style. Its loose brushwork and "unfinished" quality shocked viewers as much as its vivid, non-naturalistic colors.

Although the Fauve works on display were condemned by many—"A pot of paint has been flung in the face of the public", declared the critic Camille Mauclair—they also gained some favorable attention. The painting that was singled out for attacks was Matisse's Woman with a Hat, which was bought by Gertrude and Leo Stein for 500 francs: this had a very positive effect on Matisse's morale, which had suffered with the bad reception of his work.

Sarah Stein, the wife of Gertrude and Leo's elder brother Michael, claimed to have been the original purchaser of this painting, not Gertrude (Leo did not like the painting at first). One can see it in photographs of Sarah and Michael's home on Rue Madame.  It was a centerpiece in Sarah's home in Palo Alto, California for many years. During the 1950s, in San Francisco, it was bought by the Haas family. In 1990 Elise S. Haas bequeathed thirty-seven paintings, sculptures and works on paper to the San Francisco Museum of Modern Art, among them Femme au chapeau.

See also
 Femme au Chapeau by Jean Metzinger
 Salon d'Automne
 Fauvism

Notes and references

1905 paintings
Paintings by Henri Matisse
Paintings in the collection of the San Francisco Museum of Modern Art
Painting controversies
Fauvism